Claude Goretta (23 June 1929 – 20 February 2019) was a Swiss television producer and film director.

Life and Career 
His 1973 film L'Invitation was nominated for the Academy Award for Best Foreign Language Film. His 1981 film La provinciale was entered into the 31st Berlin International Film Festival.

Goretta is buried at the  Cimetière des Rois (Cemetery of Kings), which is considered the Genevan Panthéon.

Selected filmography
 Nice Time (1957), with Alain Tanner
 The Invitation (1973)
  (also known as, Not As Bad As All That, 1974) with Gérard Depardieu
 The Lacemaker (1977)
 La provinciale (1981)
 The Death of Mario Ricci (1983)
 Si le soleil ne revenait pas  (1987)

References

External links
 
 Claude Goretta at the Swiss Film Directory

1929 births
2019 deaths
Film people from Geneva
Swiss film directors
Swiss Protestants
Swiss screenwriters
Male screenwriters